Norton Prentiss Otis (March 18, 1840 – February 20, 1905) was a U.S. Representative from New York.

Biography
Otis was born in Halifax, Vermont. His father was Elisha Otis, inventor of the safety elevator and a descendant of the Otis family that is counted among the Boston Brahmin families. He attended public schools in Halifax, Albany, Hudson, and Yonkers, New York. In his early youth, he entered into business with his father and engaged in the manufacture of elevators for nearly fifty years.

He served as mayor of Yonkers from 1880 to 1882. He was a member of the New York State Assembly (Westchester Co., 1st D.) in 1884. He served as president of the New York State Commission to the Exposition Universelle of 1900. He served as president of St. John's Riverside Hospital of Yonkers. He was an unsuccessful candidate for election in 1900 to the 57th United States Congress.

Otis was elected as a Republican to the 58th United States Congress and representing New York's 19th congressional district from March 4, 1903, until his death from cancer in Westchester County, New York on February 20, 1905. He was interred at Oakland Cemetery.
He also was related to Amelia Earhart.

See also
List of United States Congress members who died in office (1900–49)

References

External links
 
 Norton P. Otis, late a representative from New York, Memorial addresses delivered in the House of Representatives and Senate frontispiece 1905

1840 births
1905 deaths
People from Halifax, Vermont
Otis family
Republican Party members of the United States House of Representatives from New York (state)
Republican Party members of the New York State Assembly
Mayors of Yonkers, New York
19th-century American politicians
Deaths from cancer in New York (state)
19th-century American businesspeople